James Fitzgerald (20 March 1862 – 24 June 1943) was a New Zealand cricketer and physician.

He was one of the twins born at Pigeon Bay on Banks Peninsula in 1862; his father was the educationalist William Fitzgerald. He played two first-class matches for Otago between 1883 and 1885. Fitzgerald was a physician and was the oldest one practising in New Zealand at the time of his death. He was a member of the Otago University Council. He died on 24 June 1943 in Dunedin.

References

External links
 

1862 births
1943 deaths
New Zealand cricketers
Otago cricketers
People from Banks Peninsula
Cricketers from Canterbury, New Zealand